Head of a Faun is a lost sculpture by Italian Renaissance master Michelangelo, dating from c. 1489. His first known work of sculpture in marble, it was sculpted when he was 15 or 16 as a copy of an antique work with some minor alterations. According to Giorgio Vasari's biography of the artist, it was the creation of this work that secured the young Michelangelo the patronage of Lorenzo de' Medici.

See also
List of works by Michelangelo

Sources
Artists Life — Michelangelo, page 14,15 — Enrica Crispino, 2001, Giunti Editore.
The Life of Michelangelo Buonarroti, page 23 — John Addington Symonds, BiblioBazaar.
Michael Angelo: Giorgio Vasari's Lives of the Artists, Fordham University

External links

The Boy Michelangelo carving the Head of the Faun - Sculpture of Cesare Zocchi (end of nineteenth century). It is in Casa Buonarroti

Lost sculptures
Sculptures by Michelangelo
1489 sculptures